The Lyceum School is a private school in Karachi that specializes in a two-year long A-Level program.

It was founded in 1987, and is located on Hatim Alvi Road, in the Old Clifton area of Karachi, Pakistan. It is a co-educational institution with students ages ranging somewhere between 15–19.

History
The Lyceum School was founded by Razia Shabbir Ahmed in 1987.

Academics 
The Lyceum School offers a number of subjects across the natural sciences, social sciences and humanities.

Subjects taught at the Lyceum School include physics, chemistry, mathematics, further mathematics, biology, computer science, English literature, Law, English language, economics, accounting, history, art, psychology and sociology.

Extracurricular activities

Sports 
Students are divided into Sparta, Athens, Troy and Corinthe, the different houses, with the colour of their lanyard matching their house. Sports tournaments are inter-house, city-wide, and country-wide, such as at the Lahore University of Management Sciences, where they have won many awards.

Debating 
The school has won national and international debate competitions, including the Harvard Model United Nations Conference. Its parliamentary debate team won the Karachi Cup in 2019. In 2019 Lyceum was the first school to win the Rotaract Model United Nations (ROTMUN) four times in a row.

Clubs & societies

Student government 
The student government hierarchy at The Lyceum School is as follows:

 Cabinet (President, Vice President, General Secretary, Treasurer)
 Society Chairs
 Elected Representatives
 House Captains

Awards 
 Qamar Bano Hussain Award for Discipline
 Rohda Vania Award for Integrity

Notable alumni
 Ali Kazmi
 Ali Gul Pir
 Jibran Nasir
 Aamina Sheikh
 Suhaee Abro

References

Educational institutions established in 1987
Schools in Karachi
1987 establishments in Pakistan